Vinko Polončič (born 13 July 1957) is a Yugoslav former cyclist. He competed in the individual road race and team time trial events at the 1980 Summer Olympics. He ranked 3rd in the 1983 Giro di Puglia, and 4th in the 1981 GP Capodarco.

He now works as a directeur sportif for UCI Continental team .

References

External links
 

1957 births
Living people
Yugoslav male cyclists
Olympic cyclists of Yugoslavia
Cyclists at the 1980 Summer Olympics
Sportspeople from Ljubljana
Slovenian male cyclists